The XII Memorial of Hubert Jerzy Wagner was held at Kraków Arena in Kraków, Poland from 16 to 18 August 2014. Like the previous edition, 4 teams participated in the tournament.

Qualification
All teams except the host must receive an invitation from the organizers.

Venue

Results
All times are Central European Summer Time (UTC+02:00).

Final standing

Awards
Best Spiker:  Tsvetan Sokolov
Best Blocker:  Nikolay Apalikov
Best Server:  Piotr Nowakowski
Best Setter:  Sergey Grankin
Best Libero:  Krzysztof Ignaczak
Best Receiver:  Aleksey Spiridonov
MVP:  Dmitriy Muserskiy

References

External links
Official website

Memorial of Hubert Jerzy Wagner
Memorial of Hubert Jerzy Wagner
Memorial of Hubert Jerzy Wagner
Sports competitions in Kraków
August 2014 sports events in Europe
21st century in Kraków